Boogie-woogie dance is a form of swing dance often done competitively. Although its name derives from  the boogie-woogie genre of music, it is most often danced to rock music, but was labeled boogie-woogie because the name rock 'n' roll dance was already in use for a more acrobatic dance sport. The form is cited in Madonna's hit single "Music."

Description

Boogie-woogie in competition is a led dance, not choreographed. Because of its strong Lindy Hop influence, it can contain acrobatic elements, but in a limited way that requires couples to maintain contact, preventing saltos and like moves. Its step follows a six-beat dance pattern, usually cued as "triple step, triple step, step, step", each word taking one beat but the second syllable of "triple" delayed to match the music's syncopation.

In some parts of Europe, boogie-woogie is mostly done as a social dance, while, in others, it is mostly a competition form. The competitions are regulated by the World Rock'n'Roll Confederation. Besides the adult class, the competition forms of boogie woogie include formation, senior, and junior classes.

Swing dances
Dancesport
Competitive dance
Articles containing video clips